Borwick is an English toponymic surname. Notable people with this name include:

 Bill Borwick
 Neil Borwick
 Nancy Borwick
 Peter Borwick
 Baron Borwick
 Thomas Borwick
 Leonard Borwick
 Victoria Borwick
 Broch of Borwick
 George Borwick (umpire)
 George Borwick (politician)
 Jamie Borwick, 5th Baron Borwick
 Robert Borwick, 1st Baron Borwick

 Other
 Borwick Hall
 Borwick railway station
 St Mary's Church, Borwick

See also 
 Borthwick (disambiguation)
 

English toponymic surnames
English-language surnames